Jewel is the second studio album by American singer Marcella Detroit, and her first since leaving band Shakespears Sister. It was released in March 1994 under London Records to moderate commercial success.

Critical reception 

Aaron Badgley from AllMusic gave the album a retrospective mixed review, saying "The CD sounds formulaic and overproduced by Chris Thomas. He seems to steer Marcella into mid-'90s dance grooves, which does not always fit her own distinctive sound ... When she is left alone and not "produced," the results are stunning." Johnny Huston of Entertainment Weekly also gave Jewel a mixed review, stating "Branching away from her work with Shakespear's Sister, her solo debut Jewel suffers from drab Motown and Sly Stone covers and from a Godfather of Soul impression that's more embarrassing than subversive.

Track listing

Personnel
Marcella Detroit – vocals
Phil Manzanera – guitar
Phil Spalding – bass; guitar on "Jewel", "Detroit" and "Ain't Nothing Like the Real Thing"; backing vocals on "Jewel", "Art of Melancholy", "I'm No Angel" and "You Don't Tell Me Everything"
Chuck Sabo – drums
Matthew Vaughan – programming
with:
Elton John – duet vocals on "Ain't Nothing Like the Real Thing"
Jools Holland – Hammond B-3 organ on "James Brown", piano on "Detroit"
Chris Thomas – flute on "I Believe", keyboards on "Detroit", "Ain't Nothing Like the Real Thing" and "Shadow", harpsichord on "You Don't Tell Me Everything", percussion on "Ain't Nothing Like the Real Thing", drum programming on "Prima Donna"
James "Sparks" Sinclair – guitar on "I Want to Take You Higher" and "Out of My Mind"
Gavyn Wright – strings on "James Brown" and "Out of My Mind"
George Robertson, Harry Montague-Mason, Jim Mcleod – strings on "Art of Melancholy"
Anthony Cleeth – cello on "Art of Melancholy"
David Theodore – oboe on "Art of Melancholy"
The Grange Junior Choir – choir on "I'm No Angel"

Singles 
"I Believe" was released as the lead single in February 1994, and reached No. 11 on the UK Singles Chart. The song also found similar success internationally, peaking at No. 10 in Australia, and No. 24 in Ireland. In 2005, the song was covered by German singer Joana Zimmer as her debut single, and was more successful in some territories than the original. The second single, "Ain't Nothing Like the Real Thing", a duet with Elton John, was originally included on John's album Duets, and was released as a single in May 1994. The song peaked at No. 24 in the UK. The third single "I'm No Angel" peaked at No. 33, and the fourth, "Perfect World", at No. 100.

Jewel: The Original Demo Recordings 
In 2014, Detroit independently released a compilation of the original demos recorded for the album. The 15 tracks comprise the demos for 9 of the 13 album tracks, demos for 4 B-sides, and two unreleased songs: "Second Class Citizen" and "Love and Destruction". The version of "Prima Donna" is an extended version with additional lyrics.

Track listing
"Art of Melancholy" – 4:26	
"Break the Chain" – 3:46	
"Cool People" – 3:36
"Crucify Me" – 3:49
"Detroit" – 4:16
"I Believe" – 4:33
"I'm No Angel" – 4:10
"Jewel" – 2:55
"Love and Destruction" – 3:54
"Monday Morning" – 4:08
"Perfect World" – 5:20
"Second Class Citizen" – 4:08
"You Don't Tell Me Everything" – 3:38
"You Own the Moon" – 4:18
"Prima Donna" – 2:46

Charts

Certifications

References 

1994 albums
Marcella Detroit albums
Albums produced by Chris Thomas (record producer)
London Records albums